Pasiphilodes nina is a moth in the family Geometridae. It is found on Fiji.

References

Moths described in 1975
Eupitheciini